The Zimbabwean cricket team in England in 2000 played 9 first-class matches including 2 Tests.  They also played in 7 limited overs internationals.

The first-class matches besides the two Tests were against Hampshire, Kent, Essex, Yorkshire, West Indians, Gloucestershire and British Universities.

England won the Test series against Zimbabwe, winning 1 of the matches with the other 1 drawn.

Test series summary

First Test

Second Test

External sources
CricketArchive

References
 Playfair Cricket Annual 2001
 Wisden Cricketers' Almanack 2001

2000 in Zimbabwean cricket
2000 in English cricket
International cricket competitions from 1997–98 to 2000
2000